Merunympha is a genus of moths belonging to the family Tineidae. It contains only one species, Merunympha nipha, which is found in Tanzania.

References

Endemic fauna of Tanzania
Myrmecozelinae
Monotypic moth genera
Lepidoptera of Tanzania
Moths of Africa